The following is a list of episodes for the satirical sketch comedy and discussion series The Nation.

Season 1: 2007

See also
The Nation

Lists of Australian comedy television series episodes